The following is the current leaderboard for career saves in KBO League Korean baseball.

Players with 100 or more saves
 Stats updated as of October 12, 2022.

See also
 List of KBO career strikeout leaders
 List of KBO career win leaders
 300 save club

References

Korean baseball articles
KBO career saves leaders